Janvier Besala Bokungu (born 30 January 1989) is a Congolese football (soccer) defender. He currently plays for Espérance in Tunisia. He joined the club on 26 November 2007, from TP Mazembe.

Successes 
2007 CAF- Semi-finals with TP Mazembe
2007 League Winner with TP Mazembe

External links

Democratic Republic of the Congo footballers
Democratic Republic of the Congo international footballers
Association football defenders
Espérance Sportive de Tunis players
Expatriate footballers in Tunisia
Democratic Republic of the Congo expatriate sportspeople in Tunisia
1989 births
Living people
TP Mazembe players
21st-century Democratic Republic of the Congo people